Freedom is an album by jazz guitarist Kenny Burrell. It was recorded at Van Gelder Studio in 1963–1964, and originally released in Japan by Blue Note Records.

AllMusic described it as "A funky blues set."

Track listing
All compositions by Kenny Burrell except as indicated.

"The Good Life" - 2:33
"Stairway to the Stars" (Malneck, Parish, Signorelli) - 2:42
"Loie" - 3:01
"I Hadn't Anyone Till You" (Noble) - 2:44
"G Minor Bash" - 5:55
"Freedom" - 4:49
"Lonesome Road" - 5:15
"K Twist" - 4:41
"Love, Your Spell Is Everywhere" (Edmund Goulding) - 4:44

Recording dates: March 27, 1963 (#1-3), April 2, 1963 (#4), October 22, 1964 (#5-9)

Personnel
Tracks 1-4
Kenny Burrell - guitar
Seldon Powell - tenor saxophone, baritone saxophone, flute
Hank Jones - piano, organ
Milt Hinton - bass
Osie Johnson - drums

Tracks 5-9
Kenny Burrell - guitar
Stanley Turrentine - tenor saxophone
Herbie Hancock - piano
Ben Tucker - bass
Bill English - drums
Ray Barretto - congas

Source:

References

1980 albums
Kenny Burrell albums
Blue Note Records albums
Albums produced by Alfred Lion
Albums recorded at Van Gelder Studio